The OTRAG rocket was a modular satellite-delivery rocket developed by the OTRAG company in the 1970s and 80s. The OTRAG rocket was to become a rocket built up from several mass-produced units, intended to carry satellites with a weight of 1-10 tons or more into orbit. Mass production meant that the vehicle was projected to have been 10x cheaper than conventional vehicles of similar capability.

Design

Various OTRAG rockets could be built up from the company's CRPUs (Common Rocket Propulsion Unit).  A sounding rocket would bundle four or more CRPUs in parallel, topped with the payload.  An orbital launcher would use dozens to hundreds of CRPUs, depending on payload mass.  The launcher would then stage by dropping outer CRPUs, leaving the interior ones to continue with payload.

A CRPU was essentially a steel tube, 27 cm in diameter and 16 meters long, joined from a few shorter tubes.  The CRPU was divided into three sections by aluminium bulkheads, with additional stiffening rings between bulkheads.  Forward, the majority of the tube contained a mixture of nitric acid and nitrogen tetroxide oxidisers.  Next was a section of kerosene fuel.  This was commercial-grade kerosene, not the more expensive RP-1.  Last was the engine section.  A fuel line carried nitric acid around the kerosene, into the engine.

The design of the CRPU was extremely simple.  The tubing was strong enough that the propellants were fed to the engine by pressure alone.  This eliminated the need for turbopumps.  The engine was ablatively cooled, eliminating the need for fine fuel passages and heat-resistant kerosene.  The engine did not gimbal; instead, the vehicle was steered by throttling one side's CRPUs versus the opposite side.  Thus, the engine was simply built into the tube walls, with the only mechanisms being the throttling valves.  No separate pressurising system was included; the tanks were simply left with an ullage space, which was then filled with gas to a few hundred psi.  Because of the narrow tubing, the bulkheads between sections could be simple plates, instead of domes like virtually all other rocket stages.  There was no ignition system; instead, a slug of furfuryl alcohol was injected before the kerosene.  The furfuryl alcohol ignited spontaneously upon contact with the nitric acid.

The use of ablative cooling, high-pressure steel construction, and large "empty" spaces meant that a CRPU was heavy, with relatively low performance.  The diameter of the tubing also put a hard limit on the engine diameter, preventing use of an efficient, high-expansion nozzle for the upper stages.  However, ganging CRPUs into three stages was sufficient to reach orbit.  Meanwhile, the low cost of each CRPU, after the economies of scale gained by producing hundreds or possibly thousands of them per year, would have still left the vehicle cheaper than its contemporaries.

The company's baseline launcher design claimed to lift one metric ton to orbit.  It would have consisted of a third stage core of four CRPUs, surrounded by a second stage of twelve CRPUs, in turn surrounded by the first stage's 48 CRPUs.  Larger vehicles and capacities would be achieved with greater numbers of CRPUs, possibly including several hundred per flight for a heavy launcher.

The company forecast that CRPUs would eventually be so cheap, recovering and refurbishing a launcher would be no better than simply building more units.  The use of storable propellants and few moving parts meant that launch-site operations would also be very simple.  These advantages were expected to overcome the disadvantages of small specific impulse and payload fraction.

Flight history

The engines were tested extensively on ground rigs, on both German and African test sites.  Experiments were run with varying fuel and oxidiser formulations, as the general design was quite robust.

Small, 4-unit vehicles were built and tested in Shaba North, Zaire and Seba Oasis, Libya, where heights of 20 to 50 kilometres were reached. The rockets used there were 6 and 12 meters long. The basic CRPU concept was shown to be workable, though some rockets experienced guidance or component failures.  The last launch of an OTRAG rocket took place on September 19, 1983 at Esrange. Following this launch, the OTRAG rocket was to be used in high altitude research.

Political pressure then shut down the project, as discussed in the OTRAG article.

After the company had left Libya in 1987, some remaining equipment was confiscated by the government.  However, enough parts and knowledge were missing to prevent Libya from continuing the project.

Resurgence of interest
John Carmack, CEO of Armadillo Aerospace met with Lutz Kayser, the founding engineer of OTRAG, in May, 2006 who loaned Carmack some of their original research hardware.

"I have been corresponding with Lutz for a few months now, and I have learned quite a few things. I seriously considered an OTRAG style massive-cluster-of-cheap-modules orbital design back when we had 98% peroxide (assumed to be a biprop with kerosene), and I have always considered it one of the viable routes to significant reduction in orbital launch costs. After really going over the trades and details with Lutz, I am quite convinced that this is the lowest development cost route to significant orbital capability. Eventually, reusable stages will take over, but I actually think that we can make it all the way to orbit on our current budget by following this path. The individual modules are less complicated than our current vehicles, and I am becoming more and more fond of high production methods over hand crafter prototypes." -- June 2006 Armadillo Aerospace Update

References

External links

OTRAG at Astronautix.com

Experimental rockets
Expendable space launch systems
Pressure-fed rockets

de:OTRAG-Rakete